Spencer George (born October 28, 1973) is a former American football running back in the National Football League who played for the Tennessee Oilers/Titans. He played college football for the Rice Owls.

References

1973 births
Living people
American football running backs
Tennessee Oilers players
Tennessee Titans players
Rice Owls football players